Bejel, or endemic syphilis, is a chronic skin and tissue disease caused by infection by the endemicum subspecies of the spirochete Treponema pallidum. Bejel is one of the "endemic treponematoses" (endemic infections caused by spiral-shaped bacteria called treponemes), a group that also includes yaws and pinta. Typically, endemic trepanematoses begin with localized lesions on the skin or mucous membranes. Pinta is limited to affecting the skin,  whereas bejel and yaws are considered to be invasive because they can also cause disease in bone and other internal tissues.

Signs and symptoms
Bejel usually begins in childhood as a small patch on the mucosa, often on the interior of the mouth, followed by the appearance of raised, eroding lesions on the limbs and trunk. Periostitis (inflammation) of the leg bones is commonly seen, and gummas of the nose and soft palate develop in later stages.

Causes
Although the organism that causes bejel, Treponema pallidum endemicum, is morphologically and serologically indistinguishable from Treponema pallidum pallidum, which causes venereal syphilis, transmission of bejel is not venereal in nature, generally resulting from mouth-to-mouth contact or sharing of domestic utensils, and the courses of the two diseases are somewhat different.

Diagnosis
The diagnosis of bejel is based on the geographic history of the patient as well as laboratory testing of material from the lesions (dark-field microscopy). The responsible spirochaete is readily identifiable on sight in a microscope as a treponema.

Treatment
It is treatable with penicillin or other antibiotics, resulting in a complete recovery.

Epidemiology
Bejel is mainly found in arid countries of the eastern Mediterranean region and in West Africa, where it is known as sahel. (Sahel disease should be distinguished from "Sahel", the geographical band between the Northern Sahara and Southern Sudan.)

See also 
 Pinta (disease)
 Syphilis
 Yaws

References

External links 

Bacterium-related cutaneous conditions
Syphilis
Infectious diseases
Tropical diseases